Qingning may refer to:

Qingning (1055–1064), reign period of Emperor Daozong of Liao
Qingning, Dazhou, Sichuan, China
Qingning Township, Jinchuan County, Sichuan, China